Futebol Clube do Porto is a Portuguese sports club founded in 1893 in Porto. Its association football team played its first competitive matches in 1911, when it took part and won the first edition of the José Monteiro da Costa Cup. Two years later, the club began competing in the Campeonato do Porto, a regional championship organised by the Porto Football Association. In 1921–22, Porto won the inaugural Campeonato de Portugal, a nationwide competition to determine the Portuguese champions from among the winners of the different regional championships.

The Primeira Liga was established in 1934–35 as an experimental nationwide competition played in a league format, and was contested in parallel with the Campeonato de Portugal. Porto were its first winners and repeated the triumph in 1938–39, when it became the official top-tier championship in place of the Campeonato de Portugal, which was converted into the Taça de Portugal. Porto is one of three clubs, together with Benfica and Sporting CP, to have never been relegated from the Primeira Liga since its establishment. Between 1940 and 1978, Porto endured the darkest period of its league history, during which they collected only two titles (1955–56 and 1958–59), and recorded an all-time low ninth place (1969–70). Since incumbent president Jorge Nuno Pinto da Costa took office in 1982, Porto have experienced routine league success, winning the competition 23 times in 40 seasons – five of them in succession (1995–1999), a record in Portuguese football. They achieved their first league and cup double in 1956, and have repeated it eight more times (1988, 1998, 2003, 2006, 2009, 2011, 2020, 2022).

Porto's debut in international competitions took place in 1956–57, when they competed in the second edition of the European Cup. They reached their first European final in 1984, losing the Cup Winners' Cup to Juventus, and won their first European silverware three years later, beating Bayern Munich in the 1987 European Cup Final. The following season, Porto collected the European Super Cup and Intercontinental Cup trophies. In 2003, they won the UEFA Cup for the first time, becoming the only Portuguese team to have won any of these three international trophies.

As middle of the 2022–23 season, Porto have won 83 major honours, which include 30 Primeira Liga, 18 Taça de Portugal, 1 Taça da Liga, 23 Supertaça Cândido de Oliveira, 4 Campeonato de Portugal, 2 European Cup/UEFA Champions League, 2 UEFA Cup/Europa League, 1 UEFA Super Cup, and 2 Intercontinental Cup. 
This list details the club's competitive performance and achievements for each season since 1911, and provides statistics and top scorers for domestic (regional and national) championships.

Key 

Table headers
Pos = Final position
Pld = Matches played
W = Matches won
D = Matches drawn
L = Matches lost
GF = Goals for
GA = Goals against
Pts = Points

Divisions
Reg = Regional championship (Campeonato do Porto)
Prim = Primeira Liga / Primeira Divisão (1st tier)

Top scorers

Results and rounds
  or   =  Champion or Winner
  or  = Runner-up
 GS / GS2 = Group stage / Second group stage
 PO = Play-offs
 PR = Preliminary round
 Q3 = Third qualifying round
 QF = Quarter-finals
 R16 / R32 / R64 = Round of 16, 32 and 64
 R1 / R2 / R3 / R4 = First, second, third and fourth round
 SF = Semi-finals

Seasons 
This list is updated as of 23 May 2022. Ongoing competitions or player statistics are shown in italics.

Notes

References 

Seasons
 
Porto